The Copa de Honor Municipalidad de Buenos Aires was an Argentine official football cup competition. It was contested fourteen times between 1905 and 1920.

This cup was played by teams from Buenos Aires and Rosario (which belonged to Liga Rosarina de Football). The champion of this tournament qualified to play the Copa de Honor Cousenier versus the winner of Uruguayan Copa de Honor representing the Association of that country.

In 1936, a new "Copa de Honor" was played under a regular Primera División season, with 18 teams playing a single-round tournament. San Lorenzo finished 1st and was awarded the cup. In July 2013, the Argentine Football Association recognized the 1936 edition as a Primera División honour awarded to the club.

List of champions

Finals
The following list includes all the editions of the Copa de Honor:

Titles by team

Topscorers by season
Source:

See also
 Copa de Honor Cousenier
 Copa de Honor (Uruguay)

Notes

References

Honor Municipalidad de Buenos Aires
Recurring sporting events established in 1906
Recurring events disestablished in 1936
1906 establishments in Argentina
1936 disestablishments in Argentina